Lawrence Toet (born January 2, 1962) is a Canadian politician. Born a child of Dutch parents who moved to Canada in the early fifties, he was elected to the House of Commons of Canada for the federal Conservative Party of Canada in the 2011 election, representing the electoral district of Elmwood—Transcona. In the 2015 election, Toet was defeated by NDP candidate Daniel Blaikie by 61 votes.
He later won again the candidacy for the Conservative Party of Canada for the riding of Elmwood-Transcona in March 2018 but failed to win back his seat in 2019.

Before politics
From 1984 to 2009, Toet was a partner at Premier Printing, a family owned business in Transcona.

Electoral record

References

External links
 Link to official website
 Official parliament profile
 Canada Day Message 2012

1962 births
Canadian people of Dutch descent
Conservative Party of Canada MPs
Living people
Members of the House of Commons of Canada from Manitoba
Politicians from Winnipeg
21st-century Canadian politicians